Citadel of the Dead is a computer game developed by RJBest. It was distributed by Affiliate Venture Publishing in 1994 for Macintosh.

Plot

Citadel of the Dead is a first-person fantasy role-playing game. The game features multiple character classes, including the samurai, magician, and cleric.

Reception
Comparing it to Wizardry I, Computer Gaming World in April 1994 said of Citadel of the Dead that "For those seeking instant dungeon gratification at reasonable prices, a new gauntlet has been hurled". The game was reviewed in 1995 in Dragon #219 by Jay & Dee in the "Eye of the Monitor" column, where both reviewers gave the game zero stars.

Reviews
Electronic Games

References

1994 video games
Classic Mac OS games
Classic Mac OS-only games
Fantasy video games
Role-playing video games
Video games developed in the United States